Bruno Saby (born 23 February 1949 in Grenoble) is a rally driver from France.

In 1981, Saby became French Rally Champion in a Renault 5 Turbo. He drove for the works teams of Renault, Peugeot, Volkswagen and Lancia during his career in the World Rally Championship. He took two World Rally Championship wins in his career—his first, driving a Peugeot 205 Turbo 16 E2, was in the 1986 Tour de Corse, in which Henri Toivonen and his co-driver Sergio Cresto died.  His only other win was with Lancia in the 1988 Monte Carlo Rally.

In 1978 Saby claimed the French Rallycross Championship title with an Alpine A110 1600. In the 1988 French Rallycross Championship he drove a Lancia Delta S4 to become the runner-up to Champion Guy Fréquelin who drove a Peugeot 205 Turbo 16 Evo 2.

He participated from 1992 to 2008 in cross country rallye and in the Dakar Rally, which he won in 1993 while driving for Mitsubishi. Driving for Volkswagen, he won the 2005 FIA cross-country rallye world championship.
He retired in July 2008.

WRC victories

References

External links
Profile of Saby and list of results, Rallybase.nl

1949 births
Sportspeople from La Tronche
Living people
World Rally Championship drivers
French rally drivers
Off-road racing drivers
Dakar Rally drivers
Dakar Rally winning drivers

Peugeot Sport drivers
Volkswagen Motorsport drivers